Khalil Beidas (also transliterated Khalil Bedas, Khalil Baydas, Khalil Beydas) (1874–1949), was a Palestinian scholar, educator, translator and novelist. Beidas was the father of Palestinian Lebanese banker Yousef Beidas and was a cousin of Edward Said's father.

Alongside contemporaries such as Khalil al-Sakakini, Muhammad Izzat Darwazeh and Najib Nassar, Beidas was one of Palestine's foremost intellectuals in the early twentieth century during the Al-Nahda cultural renaissance. Beidas was the pioneer of the modern Levantine short-story and novel. He was also a prolific translator—as early as 1898, he had translated some of the works of Tolstoy and Pushkin into Arabic. In addition, he established a magazine, "al-Nafā'is al-'asriyyah" (The Modern Treasures), which acquired a good name in literary circles both in the Ottoman vilayet of Syria (broadly corresponding to today's Israel, Palestine, Jordan, Syria, and Lebanon) and the Palestinian Diaspora. Beidas is also known as Raʾid al-qissa al-filastiniyya (the pioneer of Palestinian short-story). He and his wife, Adele, had 4 sons and 4 daughters.

Education and career

Beidas was born in Nazareth, Ottoman Palestine, vilayet of Syria in 1874 and studied at the Russian Orthodox al-Muskubīya (presently, according to Edward Said, a detention and interrogation centre predominantly for Palestinians) and the Russian Teachers' Training Centre in Nazareth (now an Israeli police station), which had been founded in that town in 1886. There were no tuition fees for Palestinian students, and though teaching was in Arabic, high importance was placed on studying Russian. In his recollections, Beidas stated that:'In those days, Russian schools in Palestine were, without doubt, the best.' He graduated in 1892. Beidas' education was on a basis of classical Arab culture, and, though a Christian, Beidas achieved renown as a hafiz. In his early twenties, Beidas was appointed headmaster of Russian missionary schools in many parts of Syria and Palestine. Later, he became the senior Arabic teacher at Anglican-run St. George's School in Jerusalem.

Beidas travelled in Russia after his graduation in 1892 as a ward of the Russian Orthodox Church, and during his sojourn there came under the influence of ideas of Nikolai Berdyaev, of late 19th century Russian cultural nationalists like Dostoevsky and by writers like Maxim Gorky and Leo Tolstoy. On returning to Palestine, Beidas became a prolific translator, and a dominant figure in introducing the major writers of Russian literature to the Arabic-speaking world. It was also through their Russian translations that he turned out many versions of major English, French, German and Italian writers. These innovative translations had a wide impact, not only in Palestine where he was a pioneer in the development of a modern literature, but more broadly throughout the Arab world, influencing authors as various as the Iraqi Ma'rūf al Rusāfī(1875–1945), the Lebanese Halīm Dammūs (1888–1957) and Wadī' al-Bustānī (1888–1945), Syrian authors like Qistākī al-Himsī (1858–1931). His technique in translation was distinctive—he translated freely, a creative 'arabization' that embroidered or curtailed the origins until he achieved what he considered to be the basic aim of the novel, that which is derived from everyday life and human nature.

According to Edward Said Later, Beidas's novels played an important role in the 'construction of a Palestinian national identity, particularly with regard to the influx of Zionist settlers. His first literary venture into this genre was al-Warith (The Inheritor/The heir) in 1920. The book dealt with a subject, the Palestine Partition Plan and the establishment of the state of Israel, which appeared only occasionally down to 1948, but whose significance for writers who survived the debacle only emerged after that date, retrospectively. In this work, in which a Jew gets rich via usury and decent people are exploited. It is one of the two Palestinian novels of note written before the 1948 Palestinian exodus, the other being A Chicken's Memoirs (1943) by Ishaq Musa al-Husaini. He played an important role also in the 1930s in the development of Palestinian theatre, which thrived down to 1948.

Given his strong connections with the Russian Orthodox Church, Beidas became a leading member of Palestine's Orthodox church, representing the Orthodox Christians of Northern Palestine at the Combined Council of Arab Orthodox and Greek Clergy which was charged to administer Orthodox affairs in Jerusalem.

On the occasion of the Nebi Musa riots of 1920, which arose in protest at the incipient implementation by the British Mandatory authorities of the Balfour Declaration's opening of Zionist immigration into Palestine, Beidas was one of the key speakers, credited with giving a 'soul-stirring speech. Some speakers were thought to be incendiary: the crowd responded by chanting 'we will drink the blood of the Jews'( Nashrab dam al-yahud.) Beidas's own words concluding with the remark,'My voice is weakening with emotion, but my national heart will never weaken'. He, together with several others, was rounded up and detained. He was released in 1921, according to one account in the expectation that lenience would secure his support and mitigate his opposition. Overtures came from the French Mandatory authorities in Lebanon to "grease his palm" and get him to write political propaganda against the British, an offer he refused on the grounds that he had no intention of being either a lackey of the British or a sycophant of the French. Soon after, in 1922, he published his history of the city of Jerusalem, Ta'rikh al-Quds (History of Jerusalem), (1922) A short story collection Masarih al-Adh'han (Pastures of the Mind) came out in 1924 and displays his use of fiction to moralise and edify the reader.

Beidas was interested in European culture, especially with its humanitarian and social aspects and, prompted by the contemporary Russian cultural resurgence to which he had been exposed, called for a comprehensive cultural revival in the Arab world. His own cultural works were multi-faceted: literary criticism, educational textbooks, translation of major foreign works of fiction, works on linguistics, political speeches and articles and works of Arab, Greek and European history.

Beidas' was a main proponent of the Palestinian national movement, through his journal Al-Nāfa'is as well as through a number of public speeches and articles in major Arabic (Egyptian) newspapers such as Al-Ahram and Al-Muqattam. Beidas tried to raise awareness of the threat from the Zionist immigrants, and urged the Ottoman authorities to treat the Arabs fairly.

Beidas established a unique library of old manuscripts, valuable books as well as a Stradivarius violin, all of which were lost, together with several of his manuscript compositions, when he was forced to flee to Beirut after the creation of Israel in 1948. Beidas did not outlive very long the loss of his country, and his library is thought to reside within the Jewish National Library at the Hebrew University of Jerusalem.

Al-Nafa'is
Beidas' weekly periodical, al-Nafā'is al-'asriyyah (The Modern Treasures), was founded in 1908 in Haifa, around the time of the Young Turk Revolution of July 1908. He initially described its as "a magazine for jests and fun-making pieces" (majallat latā'if wa fukāhãt). It started by running short stories but also serializations of the Russian novels he was then translating.
In one of his anonymous pieces for it, Beidas called upon the fathers of his society to prepare their children towards the 'age of freedom' (al-hurriyya), one where the free man was somebody who could make his own law (shar'ia) and guide himself (qiyadat nafsibi). Soon afterwards, in 1911, production was relocated to Jerusalem, where it was published on the printing presses of the Syrian Orphanage (Dar al-Aytam) in Jerusalem, founded by Johann Ludwig Schneller (1820–1896).
several months after the Young Turk Revolution of July 1908. It was to become one of the most popular periodicals amongst Arabs living both within the Levant and in the Palestinian Diaspora.

Beidas was in full technical control of the journal, editing most of the contents himself. It became a mouthpiece for all major active writers in Greater Syria and the Palestinian Diaspora and was distributed widely, as far a field as Brazil and Australia. An-Nafa'is became a distinguished institution, benefiting from the general cultural awakening in the region and the increased focus on literary and scientific matters.

In the preface to the first issue of An-Nafa'is, Beidas explained that he considered novels to be one of the great pillars of civilisation in the enlightenment of the mind and his aim was to draw readers' attention to the significance of narrative art from the intellectual, social and moral point of view.

Selected works

1898–99
 Ibnat al Qubtan (Pushkin's The Captain's Daughter), Beirut, 1898
 Al-Tabib al-Hathiq (The Skilled Physician), Beirut, 1898
 Al-Quzaqi al-Walhan (The Distracted Caucasian), Beirut, 1899
 History of Ancient Russia, Beirut, 1899
 Several educational books
 Several textbooks on arithmetic

1908–21
 Shaqa' al-Muluk (The Misery of Kings), 1908
 Ahwal al-Istibdad (Aleksey Nikolayevich Tolstoy's The Terrors of Totalitarianism), 1909
 Henry Al-Thamin (Henry VIII), Jerusalem, 1913
 Al-Hasna' Al-Muntakira (The Disguised Beauty), Jerusalem, 1919
 Al-Arch wa Al-Heb, 1919
 Al-Warath, 1919
 Al-Tayaran (The History of Flight), Cairo, 1912
 Rihla ila Sina (Trip to Sinai), Beirut, 1912
 Muluk al-Rus (The Tsars of Russia), Jerusalem, 1913
 Darajat Al-Hisab (Grades of Arithmetic), Volumes I and II, Jerusalem 1914
 Al-Qira'a (Grades of Reading), Volumes I–VII, Jerusalem, 1913–21
 Umam Al-Balkan (The Balkan States), Jerusalem, 1914

Collections of short stories
 Ifaaq Al-Fakar, c.1924
 Masarih Al-Adhhan (Masareeh Al-Adhan), c.1924

See also
 Palestinian Christians

Notes

Citations

Sources

Further reading 
 Ottoman Jerusalem—The Living City: 1517–1917, Ed. Sylvia Auld and Robert Hillenbrand, Chapter 2 "The Leading Intellectuals of Late Ottoman Jerusalem and Their Biographies".
 The Genesis of Arabic Narrative Discourse, Sabry Hafez.

External links
 "Short Biography (in Arabic)"
 "Short Biography (in Arabic)"
 "Detailed Article (in Arabic)"

1874 births
1949 deaths
Arab people in Mandatory Palestine
Arabs in Ottoman Palestine
Palestinian academics
Palestinian Christians
Palestinian non-fiction writers
Palestinian novelists
Palestinian schoolteachers
Palestinian translators
People from Nazareth